Ludvig Sophus Adolph Theodor Holm  (24 December 1858 – 8 April 1928) was a Danish violinist and composer.

Personal life 

Holm's father was the composer William Christian Holm, who was also a violist in the Royal Chapel. From 1875-1878 he studied at the Royal Danish Academy of Music under Valdemar Tofte, Edmund Neupert, JPE Hartmann, Niels W. Gade and Johan Christian Gebauer.

Career 

In 1880 he joined the chapel where he from 1900 - 1917 he was concertmaster. He was for many years Vice-President of the Copenhagen Chamber Music Society and for many years the artistic director of the People's Concerts. From 1911 to its end in 1920, he was head of the CFE Horneman conservatory, on whose board he sat beginning in 1906. From 1922 until his death he was a teacher at the Royal Conservatoire. He also sat on the main board of the Danish Composers' Association until 1909 and was the Order of Dannebrog.

Notable works
op. 1 Fire sange
op. 2 Klavervariationer
op. 3 klaver
op. 4 klaver
op. 5 Strygekvartet Eb-dur
op. 6 Violinkoncert (1905)
op. 7 Klaverkvintet
op. 8 Strygekvartet i Bb-dur (1913/1916/1924)
op. 9 klaver
op. 10 Symfonisk fragment (1927)
Sonate i C-dur (til konservatorieoptagelsesprøven 1874)
Allegretto (klaver 1882)
Promenade (klaver 1882)
Uset af Verdens Øie og Den Menneskesøn, som født af Gud (blandet kor SATB - 1883)
Reinald synger (blandet kor SATB - 1883)
Foraarsstemninger Sonate for Piano-Forte (1888)
Serenade (klaver 1888)
Praeludium orgel 1901
Con brio (klaver 1905)
Andante espressivo (klaver 1907)
Ländler (klaver 1915)
Kærlighed, Danmarks Æventyr (til Tivolireyen 1916)
Trois petites valses (Tirolienne, Valse lente, Ländler - 1916)
Fire Fantasiestykker for Klaver (1917)
Allegretto quasi Andantino klaver 1923
Vaarbrud og Fuglestemmer klaver 1922

See also
List of Danish composers

References

Danish classical violinists
Male classical violinists
Danish composers
Male composers
1858 births
1928 deaths